Pimpinella is a plant genus in the family Apiaceae; it includes the aromatic herb anise (P. anisum).

Species
, Plants of the World Online accepted the following species:

Pimpinella acronemastrum Farille & Lachard
Pimpinella acuminata (Edgew.) C.B.Clarke
Pimpinella acutidentata C.Norman
Pimpinella adiyamanensis Yıld. & Kılıç
Pimpinella adscendens Dalzell
Pimpinella affinis Ledeb.
Pimpinella ahmarensis Dawit
Pimpinella alismatifolia C.C.Towns.
Pimpinella anagodendron Bolle
Pimpinella anisactis Rech.f.
Pimpinella anisetum Boiss. & Balansa
Pimpinella anisoides V.Brig.
Pimpinella anisum L.
Pimpinella aromatica M.Bieb.
Pimpinella atropurpurea C.Y.Wu ex R.H.Shan & F.T.Pu
Pimpinella aurea DC.
Pimpinella barbata (DC.) Boiss.
Pimpinella battandieri Chabert
Pimpinella bialata H.Wolff
Pimpinella bisinuata H.Wolff
Pimpinella bobrovii (Woronow ex Schischk.) M.Hiroe
Pimpinella brachyclada Rech.f. & Riedl
Pimpinella bracteata Haines
Pimpinella buchananii H.Wolff
Pimpinella caffra (Eckl. & Zeyh.) D.Dietr.
Pimpinella camptotricha Penz.
Pimpinella candolleana Wight & Arn.
Pimpinella cappadocica Boiss. & Balansa
Pimpinella caudata (Franch.) H.Wolff
Pimpinella chungdienensis C.Y.Wu
Pimpinella cnidioides H.Pearson ex H.Wolff
Pimpinella coriacea (Franch.) H.Boissieu
Pimpinella corymbosa Boiss.
Pimpinella cretica Poir.
Pimpinella cumbrae Link
Pimpinella cypria Boiss.
Pimpinella dendroselinum Webb
Pimpinella deverroides (Boiss.) Boiss.
Pimpinella diversifolia DC.
Pimpinella ebracteata Baker
Pimpinella enguezekensis Yıldırım, Akalın & Yeşil
Pimpinella eriocarpa Banks & Sol.
Pimpinella erythraeae Armari
Pimpinella etbaica Schweinf.
Pimpinella fargesii H.Boissieu
Pimpinella favifolia C.Norman
Pimpinella filiformis H.Wolff
Pimpinella filipedicellata S.L.Liou
Pimpinella flaccida C.B.Clarke
Pimpinella gilanica Mozaff.
Pimpinella grisea H.Wolff
Pimpinella hadacii Engstrand
Pimpinella hastata C.B.Clarke
Pimpinella helosciadoidea H.Boissieu
Pimpinella henryi Diels
Pimpinella heyneana (DC.) Benth. & Hook.f.
Pimpinella heywoodii Dawit
Pimpinella hirtella (Hochst.) A.Rich.
Pimpinella homblei C.Norman
Pimpinella huillensis Welw. ex Engl.
Pimpinella ibradiensis Çinbilgel, Eren, H.Duman & Gökceoğlu
Pimpinella × intermedia Figert
Pimpinella inundata (Farille & S.B.Malla) P.K.Mukh. & Constance
Pimpinella isaurica V.A.Matthews
Pimpinella javana DC.
Pimpinella junionae Ceballos & Ortuño
Pimpinella kaessneri (H.Wolff) Cannon
Pimpinella kawalekhensis Farille & Lachard
Pimpinella keniensis C.Norman
Pimpinella khayyamii Mozaff.
Pimpinella khorasanica Engstrand
Pimpinella kingdon-wardii H.Wolff
Pimpinella koelzii M.Hiroe
Pimpinella kotschyana Boiss.
Pimpinella kurdica Rech.f. & Riedl
Pimpinella kyimbilaensis H.Wolff
Pimpinella ledermannii H.Wolff
Pimpinella leschenaultii DC.
Pimpinella liiana M.Hiroe
Pimpinella limprichtii H.Wolff
Pimpinella lindblomii H.Wolff
Pimpinella lineariloba Cannon
Pimpinella lutea Desf.
Pimpinella major (L.) Huds.
Pimpinella menachensis Schweinf. ex H.Wolff
Pimpinella mulanjensis C.C.Towns.
Pimpinella nana Pimenov
Pimpinella neglecta C.Norman
Pimpinella nephrophylla Rech.f. & Riedl
Pimpinella nervosa C.B.Clarke
Pimpinella niitakayamensis Hayata
Pimpinella nudicaulis Trautv.
Pimpinella nyingchiensis Z.H.Pan & K.Yao
Pimpinella oliverioides Boiss. & Hausskn.
Pimpinella olivieri Boiss.
Pimpinella oreophila Hook.f.
Pimpinella paludosa C.C.Towns.
Pimpinella parishiana Kurz
Pimpinella pastinacifolia (Boiss.) H.Wolff
Pimpinella paucidentata V.A.Matthews
Pimpinella peregrina L.
Pimpinella peucedanifolia Fisch. ex Ledeb.
Pimpinella physotrichioides C.Norman
Pimpinella pimpinelloides (Hochst.) H.Wolff
Pimpinella pretenderis Orph. ex Halácsy
Pimpinella procumbens (Boiss.) Pau
Pimpinella propinqua H.Wolff
Pimpinella pruatjan Molk.
Pimpinella puberula (DC.) Boiss.
Pimpinella purpurea (Franch.) H.Boissieu
Pimpinella renifolia H.Wolff
Pimpinella rhodantha Boiss.
Pimpinella rhomboidea Diels
Pimpinella richardsiae C.C.Towns.
Pimpinella rigidistyla C.C.Towns.
Pimpinella rigidiuscula C.C.Towns.
Pimpinella rigidula (Boiss. & Orph.) H.Wolff
Pimpinella robynsii C.Norman
Pimpinella rollae Billore & Hemadri
Pimpinella rubescens (Franch.) H.Wolff ex Hand.-Mazz.
Pimpinella saxifraga L.
Pimpinella schimperi Dawit
Pimpinella schweinfurthii Asch.
Pimpinella serbica (Vis.) Benth. & Hook.f. ex Drude
Pimpinella sikkimensis C.B.Clarke
Pimpinella silvatica Hand.-Mazz.
Pimpinella silvicola Hemp
Pimpinella sintenisii H.Wolff
Pimpinella smithii H.Wolff
Pimpinella squamosa Karjagin
Pimpinella stracheyi C.B.Clarke
Pimpinella × subnigra Tzvelev
Pimpinella tagawae M.Hiroe
Pimpinella tenuicaulis Baker
Pimpinella thellungiana H.Wolff
Pimpinella tibetanica H.Wolff
Pimpinella tirupatiensis N.P.Balakr. & Subr.
Pimpinella tomentosa Dalzell ex C.B.Clarke
Pimpinella tongloensis P.K.Mukh.
Pimpinella tragioides (Boiss.) Benth. & Hook.f. ex Drude
Pimpinella tragium Vill.
Pimpinella tripartita Kalen.
Pimpinella triternata Diels
Pimpinella tunceliana Yıld.
Pimpinella turcomanica Schischk.
Pimpinella urbaniana Fedde ex H.Wolff
Pimpinella urceolata Watt ex Banerji
Pimpinella valleculosa K.T.Fu
Pimpinella villosa Schousb.
Pimpinella wallichiana (Miq.) Gandhi (syn. Pimpinella monoica)
Pimpinella wallichii C.B.Clarke
Pimpinella woodii C.C.Towns.
Pimpinella xizangensis R.H.Shan & F.T.Pu
Pimpinella yunnanensis (Franch.) H.Wolff
Pimpinella zagrosica Boiss. & Hausskn.

Former species include:
Pimpinella brachycarpa → Spuriopimpinella brachycarpa

References

External links

 
Medicinal plants
Apioideae genera